Dismorphia lycosura is a butterfly in the  family Pieridae. It is found in Ecuador and Peru.

References

Dismorphiinae
Butterflies described in 1860
Pieridae of South America
Taxa named by William Chapman Hewitson